Live to Die is the debut album by the speed metal band Intruder. It was originally released in 1987 and re-released in 2004 on vinyl and CD (which includes bonus tracks from the 1986 and 1984 demos recorded under the name "Transgresser").

Track listing
"Cover Up" - 4:00	
"Turn Back" - 4:43	
"Victory in Disguise" - 5:35	
"Live to Die" - 6:35	
"Kiss of Death" - 5:41	
"Cold-Blooded Killer" - 5:29	
"Blind Rage" - 5:17	
"T.M. (You Paid the Price)" - 4:37

Re-release bonus tracks
"Cold-Blooded Killer" (Transgresser demo 86) - 5:17
"Blind Rage" (Transgresser demo 86) - 5:23
"Victory In" Disguise (Transgresser demo 86) - 4:56
"Cover Up" (Transgresser demo 84) - 3:53
"Night Shift" (Transgresser demo 84) - 4:22
"Live to Die" (Transgresser demo 84) - 6:36

Personnel
James Hamilton – vocals
Arthur Vinett – guitar
Todd Nelson – bass
John Pieroni – drums

References

1987 debut albums
Intruder (American band) albums